WLPG can refer to:

 Windows Live Photo Gallery
 WLPG (FM), an FM radio station licensed to Florence, South Carolina